The President of the Chamber of Deputies of Romania is the deputy elected to preside over the meetings in the lower chamber of the Parliament of Romania. The President of the Chamber of Deputies is also the president of the Standing Bureau of the Chamber of Deputies, and the second in the presidential line of succession, after the President of the Senate.

Election 

Last election: November 2021

The president of the Chamber of Deputies is elected by secret ballot with the majority of votes of the deputies. If none of the candidates receives the absolute majority of votes, the first two compete again in a second ballot, and the one with most of the votes wins.

Role 

 Calls the Chamber of Deputies into ordinary or extraordinary session;
 Presides over the Chamber's meetings;
 Represents the Chamber of Deputies in the relation with the president, the Senate, the Government and the Constitutional Court;
 Represents the Chamber of Deputies in the foreign relations;
 Succeeds (ad interim) the president of Romania if the president of the Senate cannot do so. He/she continues to be president of the Chamber of Deputies during the ad-interim presidency of the country and acts as president until a new president is elected or the old president comes back in office after a failed impeachment.

History

1862–1948 

Between 1862 and 1948 the lower house was called Assembly of Deputies. In 1946, the Senate was abolished by a Governmental amendment to the 1923 Constitution, and the Parliament became unicameral.

1948–1989 

The Legislative was called Great National Assembly.

1990–1992 

The legislative became bicameral again, and the lower house was called again Assembly of Deputies, as part of the Constituent Assembly, elected together with the Senate to form both the legislative body and the body elected to write the new constitution. The assembly was headed by an elected president.

1992–present 

After the Constitution was voted, the assembly changed the name in Chamber of Deputies, headed by a president.

List of officeholders 

The political stance of presidents of the lower house prior to the development of a modern party system is given by the following key/legend:

The political stance of presidents of the lower house after the development of a modern party system is given by the following key/legend:

Interim (acting) officeholders are denoted by italics. The Rule of the Chamber of Deputies states that at the first standing of the house, the meeting is headed by the eldest senator and helped by the youngest senator. Those bear the title of Interim President of the Senate, and, as their term is very short (one or two days) are not listed. The interim officeholders listed have hold the office in different circumstances and for a longer time (i.e. for more than one or two days).

References 

 President's page on the Chamber of Deputies website 

Romania, Chamber of Deputies

1862 establishments in Romania
1990 establishments in Romania